Decade in the Sun: Best of Stereophonics is a compilation album of greatest hits by Stereophonics. It features tracks from all six of the band's previous albums, beginning from the 1997 debut release, Word Gets Around, all the way through to 2007's Pull the Pin, plus two brand new songs, "You're My Star" and "My Own Worst Enemy". "You're My Star" was also released as a single.

The two-disc album features five songs from Just Enough Education to Perform, seven songs from Performance and Cocktails, seven songs from Word Gets Around, four songs from Language. Sex. Violence. Other?, six songs from You Gotta Go There to Come Back, four songs from Pull the Pin, one song from Reload, two b-sides, two non-album singles and two new songs for this album. The one-disc album features five songs from Just Enough Education to Perform, four songs from Performance and Cocktails, four songs from Word Gets Around, three songs from Language. Sex. Violence. Other?, one song from You Gotta Go There to Come Back, one song from Pull the Pin and two new songs for this album.

Critical response

Decade in the Sun received generally favourable reviews. Writing for the BBC, Sophie Bruce wrote a positive review. She labelled the album as a "fantastic selection sure to thrill Stereophonics superfans and new recruits alike" but criticised the band's choice of excluding "Madame Helga" and "Moviestar", two of their greatest hits in the UK. 
At Contactmusic.com, Alex Lai praised the compilation, particularly disc two's track selection for not "just throw[ing] in the singles that didn't make the regular release." Lai summarised that the album "act[s] as a good metaphor for Stereophonics." Stephen Thomas Erlewine from AllMusic found the band's evolution "effective" and "entertaining". In the negative however, he called the album "too comprehensive to be entertaining" and described the tracks as dragging "its heels over 20 tracks that all sound huge and hookless." Erlewine concluded the album shows listeners "why Stereophonics never translated across the Atlantic."

Chart performance
The album debuted at number 2 with sales of 67,073 in the UK. The album is available in a 20-track edition, 40-track 2-CD Deluxe edition and DVD edition containing all the band's music videos, best live performances and some extra footage. With sales of 528,000 it was the 13th biggest selling album of 2008 in the UK. As of 16 March 2013, it had sold 1,044,219 copies in the United Kingdom. To date the album has spent 161 weeks in the top 100 UK Albums Chart.

Track listing

Charts and certifications

Weekly charts

Year-end charts

Decade-end charts

Certifications

DVD

Decade in the Sun: Best of Stereophonics is a DVD released by Welsh rock band Stereophonics, coinciding with their greatest hits album of the same name. The DVD features all music videos from the band's debut album, Word Gets Around, up to 2007's Pull the Pin, as well as the video for "You're My Star."

Track listing

More Life in a Tramps Vest
A Thousand Trees
Traffic
Local Boy in the Photograph (1998 version)
The Bartender and the Thief
Just Looking
Pick a Part That's New
I Wouldn't Believe Your Radio
Hurry Up and Wait
Mama Told Me Not to Come
Mr. Writer
Have A Nice Day
Step on My Old Size Nines
Handbags and Gladrags
Vegas Two Times
Madame Helga
Maybe Tomorrow
Since I Told You It's Over
Moviestar
Dakota
Superman
Devil
Rewind
It Means Nothing
You're My Star

References

External links
Decade in the Sun: Best of Stereophonics at Stereophonics.com

Stereophonics albums
Stereophonics video albums
2008 greatest hits albums
2008 video albums
Music video compilation albums
V2 Records compilation albums
V2 Records video albums